Vision of Sorrows is a 1994 album by the band Lestat. It was the first release by the band to be available on CD format. It was not until 2010 that the full album was available through digital distribution. The CD was originally released by Jevan Records.

Track listing

Credits
Razz (Evan Nave) - vocals, drum programming and keyboards
Susan - guitar and backing vocals
Jess - keyboards and backing vocals
Timothy - drums and drum programming

References

Dark wave albums
1994 albums